Marcus Dwayne Lawton (born August 18, 1965) is an American former professional baseball outfielder. He was born on August 18, 1965 in Gulfport, Mississippi. Drafted by the New York Mets in 1983. he played in 10 career games with the New York Yankees of the Major League Baseball (MLB) in 1989, compiling 3 hits in 14 at-bats. He played his final game on October 1, 1989. His younger brother, Matt Lawton, also played in the majors.

External links
, or Retrosheet, or Pura Pelota (Venezuelan Winter League)

1965 births
Living people
African-American baseball players
American expatriate baseball players in Canada
Baseball players from Mississippi
Columbia Mets players
Columbus Clippers players
Edmonton Trappers players
Gulf Coast Mets players
Jackson Mets players
Kingsport Mets players
Lynchburg Mets players
Major League Baseball outfielders
Memphis Chicks players
Midland Angels players
New York Yankees players
Sportspeople from Gulfport, Mississippi
Tidewater Tides players
Tigres de Aragua players
American expatriate baseball players in Venezuela
Vancouver Canadians players
21st-century African-American people
20th-century African-American sportspeople